
Elbląg County is a unit of territorial administration and local government (powiat) in Warmian-Masurian Voivodeship, northern Poland. It came into being on January 1, 1999, as a result of the Polish local government reforms passed in 1998. Its administrative seat is the city of Elbląg, although the city is not part of the county (it constitutes a separate city county).

In 2019, its total population was 57,395, of which the population of Pasłęk was 12,160, that of Tolkmicko was 2,689, that of Młynary was 1,772, and the rural population was 40,774.

Famous people from Elblag
Joanna Wolosz
Polish sportswoman
Hans-Jurgen Krupp
German Politician
Krystian Zolnierewicz
Polish association football player
Oskar Bekukh
Polish eSports player/middleweight boxer

Neighbouring counties
Apart from the city of Elbląg, Elbląg County is also bordered by Braniewo County to the north-east, Lidzbark County to the east, Ostróda County to the south-east, Sztum County to the south-west, Malbork County and Nowy Dwór Gdański County to the west and the Vistula Lagoon to the north-west.

Administrative division
The county is subdivided into nine gminas (three urban-rural and six rural). These are listed in the following table, in descending order of population.

References

 
Land counties of Warmian-Masurian Voivodeship